Matthew William Dellavedova (born 8 September 1990) is an Australian professional basketball player for the Sacramento Kings of the National Basketball Association (NBA). He played college basketball for Saint Mary's College. In 2016, he won the NBA championship as a member of the Cleveland Cavaliers. As a member of the Australian national team, he won bronze at the Tokyo 2020 Olympics.

Early life
Dellavedova was born and raised in Maryborough, Victoria, as a sixth-generation Italian Australian. As a junior, he played basketball, tennis, soccer, and Australian rules football. On the football field, Dellavedova played the position of wing and kicked a total of 32 goals in 26 games between 1999 and 2001, but gave the game away to focus solely on basketball.

Dellavedova played junior basketball for the Maryborough Blazers and Bendigo Braves. After playing State basketball for Victoria Country, he attended the Australian Institute of Sport (AIS) in Canberra for three years. Prior to leaving for the AIS on a scholarship, he attended Maryborough Regional College. While in Canberra, he attended Lake Ginninderra Secondary College. In 2017, he was inducted into the Lake Ginninderra Hall of Fame.

Between 2007 and 2009, Dellavedova played for the AIS in the South East Australian Basketball League (SEABL). He averaged 15.2 points, 4.8 rebounds and 3.5 assists in 18 games in 2008, and 10.9 points, 5.0 rebounds, and 3.0 assists in nine games in 2009.

College career

Dellavedova was recruited by Randy Bennett and the Saint Mary's College of California in 2009 and signed with the Gaels before the 2009–10 season. He was ranked by ESPN as one of the top junior players in Australia. Dellavedova immediately contributed for the Gaels and started all 34 games as a freshman. In 2009–10, he averaged 12.1 points, 3.5 rebounds, and 4.5 assists per game. That season, the Gaels won 28 games and reached the Sweet Sixteen of the 2010 NCAA men's basketball tournament. The Gaels reached the Sweet Sixteen by upsetting Villanova, 75–68. Dellavedova's crucial late free throws iced the game against the Wildcats.

On 16 January 2013, Dellavedova scored 18 points, including a game-winning three-point buzzer-beater, in a 70–69 victory over the BYU Cougars. The forty-foot shot soon became known as the "Dellavedagger." In 2012–13, Dellavedova was an Academic All-America selection and a Senior CLASS Award finalist.

Dellavedova graduated from Saint Mary's in 2013 with a degree in psychology. He finished his college career as Saint Mary's all-time leader in scoring, assists, games played, free throw percentage, and three-point shots.

St. Mary's retired his jersey on 15 February 2014. Dellavedova's #4 was the second retired by the school's men's basketball program, joining Tom Meschery in the rafters of McKeon Pavilion.

Professional career

Cleveland Cavaliers (2013–2016)

2013–14 season
After going undrafted in the 2013 NBA draft, Dellavedova joined the Cleveland Cavaliers for the 2013 NBA Summer League. On 12 September 2013, he signed a two-year, $1.3 million contract with the Cavaliers, with $100,000 guaranteed. On 26 March 2014, he scored a career-high 21 points in a 97–96 win over the Detroit Pistons.

2014–15 season

In July 2014, Dellavedova re-joined the Cavaliers for the 2014 NBA Summer League. Between 5 November and 5 December, Dellavedova was sidelined with a sprained medial collateral ligament (MCL). In February 2015, he participated in the Rising Stars Challenge as part of the NBA All-Star weekend. In the regular-season finale on 15 April, he recorded 18 points and 12 assists in a 113–108 overtime win over the Washington Wizards.

In Game 6 of the Eastern Conference semifinals, Dellavedova scored a team-high 19 points to help the Cavaliers defeat the Chicago Bulls and advance to the Conference Finals. Following the Cavaliers' Game 3 win over the Atlanta Hawks in Eastern Conference Finals, Dellavedova's aggressive play became a major talking point with some describing him as a "dirty" player. Despite this criticism, teammate LeBron James and NBA great Charles Barkley both defended Dellavedova's style of play. The Cavaliers defeated the Hawks 4–0 to advance to the 2015 NBA Finals.

In Game 2 of the NBA Finals against the Golden State Warriors, in the absence of the injured Kyrie Irving, Dellavedova held Stephen Curry to 0-of-8 shooting and four turnovers while guarding him. The Cavaliers won Game 2 in double-overtime, 95–93, for their first victory of an NBA Finals game in franchise history. In Game 3, Dellavedova scored a playoff career-high 20 points as the Cavaliers defeated the Warriors to take a 2–1 series lead. After the game, Dellavedova was so dehydrated that he needed an IV, and he was quickly taken to the Cleveland Clinic for medical attention. The Cavaliers went on to lose the last three games of the series, and Dellavedova shot just 19% from the field in those three games.

2015–16 season
On 27 July 2015, Dellavedova re-signed with the Cavaliers. On 19 November 2015, he recorded a then career-high 13 assists in a 115–100 win over the Milwaukee Bucks. On 20 December, he scored a season-high 20 points on 7-of-10 shooting in a 108–86 win over the Philadelphia 76ers. He missed five straight games in February 2016 with a strained hamstring. The Cavaliers returned to the NBA Finals in 2016 with a 4–2 series win over the Toronto Raptors in the Eastern Conference Finals. In a Finals rematch with the Golden State Warriors, the Cavaliers became the first team in NBA history to win the championship after being down 3–1 in the series.

Milwaukee Bucks (2016–2018)

On 7 July 2016, Dellavedova was acquired by the Milwaukee Bucks in a sign-and-trade deal with the Cavaliers, in which Cleveland received a $4.8 million trade exception and the rights to Albert Miralles, while Milwaukee also received cash considerations. Dellavedova's contract gave him $38 million over four years.

Dellavedova made his debut for the Bucks in their season opener on 26 October 2016, scoring 11 points in 29 minutes as a starter in a 107–96 loss to the Charlotte Hornets. On 3 December 2016, he scored 12 of his season-high 18 points in the fourth quarter of the Bucks' 112–103 win over the Brooklyn Nets. After starting all 30 games to begin the season, he missed five straight games in late December and early January with a strained right hamstring. In 2016–17, he averaged career highs in points (7.6) and assists (4.7) in a career-high 26.1 minutes per game over 76 contests with a career-high 54 starts.

Dellavedova missed 15 consecutive games with left knee tendinitis during November and December of the 2017–18 season. On 1 January 2018, Dellavedova had a season-high 10 assists in a 131–127 overtime loss to the Toronto Raptors. A right ankle sprain suffered on 4 February against the Nets saw Dellavedova miss 29 straight games, returning to action in the Bucks' regular-season finale against the Philadelphia 76ers on 11 April. He went on to play in six of the Bucks' seven playoff games.

Return to Cleveland (2018–2021)

On 7 December 2018, Dellavedova was acquired by the Cleveland Cavaliers in a three-team trade that also involved the Bucks and the Washington Wizards. In his return game for the Cavaliers in Milwaukee three days later, Dellavedova received an ovation when he entered the game and finished with 11 points in 16 minutes in a 108–92 loss to the Bucks.

On 7 March 2020, Dellavedova recorded a career-high 14 assists in a 104–102 win over the Denver Nuggets.

On 25 November 2020, Dellavedova re-signed with the Cavaliers. He appeared in just 13 games with the Cavaliers during the 2020–21 season as he suffered a variety of ailments, including a concussion, whiplash, an emergency appendectomy, and a neck strain.

Melbourne United (2021–2022)
On 9 July 2021, Dellavedova signed a three-year deal with Melbourne United of the Australian NBL. On 16 January 2022, he scored a career-high 33 points with seven 3-pointers and nine assists in an 88–84 win over the Illawarra Hawks. He averaged 10.3 points and 4.3 assists per game during the 2021–22 NBL season. He parted ways with United in July 2022 to return to the NBA.

Sacramento Kings (2022–present)
On 29 July 2022, Dellavedova signed with the Sacramento Kings. The Kings guaranteed Dellavedova's contract for the remainder of the season on 5 January 2023.

Career statistics

NBA

Regular season

|-
| style="text-align:left;"| 
| style="text-align:left;"| Cleveland
| 72 || 4 || 17.7 || .412 || .368 || .792 || 1.7 || 2.6 || .5 || .1 || 4.7
|-
| style="text-align:left;"| 
| style="text-align:left;"| Cleveland
| 67 || 13 || 20.6 || .362 || .407 || .763 || 1.9 || 3.0 || .4 || .0 || 4.8
|-
| style="text-align:left;background:#afe6ba;"| †
| style="text-align:left;"| Cleveland
| 76 || 14 || 24.6 || .405 || .410 || .864 || 2.1 || 4.4 || .6 || .1 || 7.5
|-
| style="text-align:left;"| 
| style="text-align:left;"| Milwaukee
| 76 || 54 || 26.1 || .390 || .367 || .854  || 1.9 || 4.7 || .7 || .0 || 7.6
|-
| style="text-align:left;"| 
| style="text-align:left;"| Milwaukee
| 38 || 3 || 18.7 || .362 || .372 || .926  || 1.7 || 3.8 || .4 || .0 || 4.3
|-
| style="text-align:left;"| 
| style="text-align:left;"| Milwaukee
| 12 || 0 || 8.1 || .316 || .364 || 1.000  || .8 || 2.4 || .2 || .0 || 1.7
|-
| style="text-align:left;"| 
| style="text-align:left;"| Cleveland
| 36 || 0 || 19.9 || .413 || .336 || .792  || 1.9 || 4.2 || .3 || .1 || 7.3
|-
| style="text-align:left;"| 
| style="text-align:left;"| Cleveland
| 57 || 4 || 14.4 || .354 || .231 || .865  || 1.3 || 3.2 || .4 || .0 || 3.1
|-
| style="text-align:left;"| 
| style="text-align:left;"| Cleveland
| 13 || 1 || 17.2 || .250 || .160 || 1.000  || 1.8 || 4.5 || .3 || .1 || 2.8
|- class="sortbottom"
| style="text-align:center;" colspan="2"| Career
| 447 || 93 || 20.3 || .386 || .364 || .840 || 1.8 || 3.7 || .5 || .0 || 5.5

Playoffs

|-
| style="text-align:left;"| 2015
| style="text-align:left;"| Cleveland
| 20 || 7 || 24.9 || .346 || .316 || .781 || 2.1 || 2.7 || .5 || .0 || 7.2
|-
| style="text-align:left;background:#afe6ba;"| 2016†
| style="text-align:left;"| Cleveland
| 20 || 0 || 12.1 || .351 || .258 || .750 || .8 || 2.8 || .1 || .1 || 3.9
|-
| style="text-align:left;"| 2017
| style="text-align:left;"| Milwaukee
| 6 || 0 || 26.5 || .390 || .375 || .800 || 2.0 || 2.0 || .2 || .0 || 7.7
|-
| style="text-align:left;"| 2018
| style="text-align:left;"| Milwaukee
| 6 || 0 || 13.0 || .333 || .222 || 1.000 || .8 || 2.7 || .3 || .0 || 2.0
|- class="sortbottom"
| style="text-align:center;" colspan="2"| Career
| 52 || 7 || 18.8 || .354 || .303 || .779 || 1.4 || 2.6 || .3 || .0 || 5.4

College

|-
| style="text-align:left;"| 2009–10
| style="text-align:left;"| Saint Mary's
| 34 || 34 || 36.4 || .390 || .398 || .850 || 3.5 || 4.5 || 1.2 || .0 || 12.1
|-
| style="text-align:left;"| 2010–11
| style="text-align:left;"| Saint Mary's
| 34 || 31 || 35.3 || .418 || .376 || .881 || 3.6 || 5.3 || 1.2 || .0 || 13.4
|-
| style="text-align:left;"| 2011–12
| style="text-align:left;"| Saint Mary's
| 33 || 33 || 37.5 || .446 || .355 || .857 || 3.3 || 6.4 || .8 || .1 || 15.5
|-
| style="text-align:left;"| 2012–13
| style="text-align:left;"| Saint Mary's
| 35 || 35 || 36.4 || .404 || .382 || .852 || 3.4 || 6.4 || 1.1 || .1 || 15.8
|- class="sortbottom"
| style="text-align:center;" colspan="2"| Career
| 136 || 133 || 36.4 || .415 || .378 || .860 || 3.5 || 5.7 || 1.1 || .1 || 14.2

Player profile 
Dellavedova is well known for his high levels of effort while playing. Multiple players, coaches, and commentators have praised his toughness and competitiveness, particularly on defense. On account of his aggressiveness, some have cast Dellavedova as reckless or dirty. However, multiple current and former players have spoken in defense of Dellavedova, including LeBron James, Kobe Bryant, Charles Barkley, and Antonio Davis. Dellavedova's offensive strengths includes his three-point shot, his floater, and his passing ability.

International career
Dellavedova competed for the Australian junior national team at the 2009 FIBA Under-19 World Championship. He was the team's third leading scorer – averaging 10.1 points per game – for the fourth-place Australians. He was named in the Australian senior national team, the Boomers, to compete for the first time at the 2009 FIBA Oceania Championship. At age 19, he was the youngest Australian player at the competition. He went on to compete for the Boomers at the 2012 London Olympics, the 2014 World Cup in Spain, the 2016 Rio Olympics, and the 2019 World Cup in China. At the 2020 Olympics, he helped Australia win bronze.

Personal life
Dellavedova's father, Mark, grew up playing Australian rules football and his mother, Leanne, played netball. Both of Dellavedova's sisters, Yana and Ingrid, play basketball as well.

Dellavedova married his long-time girlfriend, Anna Schroeder, on 1 July 2017, after proposing to her on 10 September 2016. Dellavedova met Schroeder at Saint Mary's, where she played volleyball and was an honor roll student. They started dating after his senior year. On 5 July 2019, the couple announced they were expecting their first child, a boy. On 6 November, he announced the birth of his son, Anders Ralph Dellavedova.

He has a second cousin, also named Matthew Dellavedova, who is a tennis player in Australia. Dellavedova is good friends with his former Cavaliers teammate, Joe Harris.

Dellavedova is an avid supporter of the Collingwood Magpies in the Australian Football League.

Community involvement
On 28 March 2015, Dellavedova escorted Jackie Custer, a 17-year-old cancer patient, to Akron Children's Hospital's "A Prom to Remember" event. Custer was asked to choose a celebrity guest to escort her to the event, and chose Dellavedova. Custer stated, "Going to prom with Delly was a night I'll never forget. It was definitely magical, and he's the sweetest guy I've ever met."

References

External links

  and NBL.com.au
 Matthew Dellavedova at Official Site of the 2012 Australian Olympic Team
 Saint Mary's Gaels bio
 
 
 
 
 

1990 births
Living people
2014 FIBA Basketball World Cup players
2019 FIBA Basketball World Cup players
Australian expatriate basketball people in the United States
Australian Institute of Sport basketball players
Australian men's basketball players
Australian people of Italian descent
Basketball players at the 2012 Summer Olympics
Basketball players at the 2016 Summer Olympics
Basketball players at the 2020 Summer Olympics
Cleveland Cavaliers players
Medalists at the 2020 Summer Olympics
Melbourne United players
Milwaukee Bucks players
National Basketball Association players from Australia
Olympic basketball players of Australia
Olympic bronze medalists for Australia
Olympic medalists in basketball
People educated at Lake Ginninderra College
People from Maryborough, Victoria
Point guards
Sacramento Kings players
Saint Mary's Gaels men's basketball players
Shooting guards
Undrafted National Basketball Association players